Raphael Kuhner Wuppermann (July 6, 1883 – June 11, 1956), known professionally as Ralph Morgan, was a Hollywood stage and film character actor, and the older brother of Frank Morgan.

Early life
Morgan was born in New York City, the eighth of eleven children of Josephine Wright (née Hancox) and George Diogracia Wuppermann. His mother was a Mayflower descendant. His father, George Wuppermann, was of Spanish and German lineage. Born in Venezuela and raised in Germany, he later immigrated to the United States. He had made a fortune by distributing Angostura bitters, allowing him to send all of his children to universities.

Morgan attended Trinity School, Riverview Military Academy and graduated from Columbia University with a law degree. However, after almost two years' practicing, he abandoned the world of jurisprudence for the vocation of journeyman actor, having already appeared in Columbia's annual Varsity Show. In 1905, billed as Raphael Kuhner Wupperman, he appeared in The Khan of Kathan, that year's variety show.

Career
His first role on the stage came in The Bachelor in 1909 and in 1913 he joined the Summer stock cast at Denver's Elitch Theatre. Later he played John Marvin in the 1918 hit play, Lightnin' . Morgan made his debut in silent films in 1915, appearing in several productions made on the East Coast. In the early talkie era, he played such leading roles in such productions as Strange Interlude in 1932 and Rasputin and the Empress  also in 1932.

He later settled into secondary, sometimes uncredited, character parts. One of his memorable roles was in the 1942 serial Gang Busters, in which he played a brilliant surgeon turned master criminal. Morgan later worked in both radio and television, frequently in religious dramas filmed for Family Theater.

Among his off-camera activities, he, alongside Grant Mitchell, Berton Churchill, Charles Miller, Alden Gay, and Kenneth Thomson, formed the Screen Actors Guild to resolve and stop most of the injustice that actors faced within the industry (among which, were prolonged work hours enforced by the studios and the Academy of Motion Pictures Arts and Sciences' membership policy, which was exclusively by invitation).

He was also a founder, charter member, and the first president of SAG in 1933, and he was elected to two additional one-year terms in 1938 and 1939, serving until 1940.

Morgan became so successful in stock and on Broadway that his younger brother, Frank, was encouraged to give acting a try, using the same surname as Ralph for his stage name. His career would eventually overshadow that of Ralph.

Recognition
Morgan has a star in the Motion Pictures section of the Hollywood Walk of Fame at 1617 Vine Street. It was dedicated February 8, 1960.

Personal life and death
Ralph Morgan was married to Georgiana Louise Iverson, who as a stage actress was known as Grace Arnold, although he called her "Daisy" and was the father of Claudia Morgan (born Claudia Louise Wuppermann; 1911–1974), an actress best known for creating the role of Vera Claythorne on Broadway in the original production of Ten Little Indians, and for her portrayal of Nora Charles on the radio series The Thin Man.

Morgan died on June 11, 1956, of a lung ailment. He was buried at Green-Wood Cemetery in Brooklyn, New York.

Selected filmography

 Seeds of Jealousy (1914) (film debut)
 The Man Trail (1915) 
 The Master of the House (1915) as Young Hoffman - the Son
 Madame X (1916) as Raymond Floriot
 The Penny Philanthropist (1917) as Tom Oliphant
 The Man Who Found Himself (1925) as Edwin Macauley Jr
 Honor Among Lovers (1931) as Riggs
 Dance Team (1932) as Alex Prentice
 Charlie Chan's Chance (1932) as Barry Kirk
 Cheaters at Play (1932) as Freddie Isquith
 After Tomorrow (1932) as Dr. Sullivan (uncredited)
 Disorderly Conduct (1932) as James Crawford
 Devil's Lottery (1932) as Captain Geoffrey Maitland
 Strange Interlude (1932) as Charlie Marsden
 Jungle Mystery (1932, Serial) as Recap Narrator (voice, uncredited)
 Rasputin and the Empress (1932) as The Czar - Nicholai Alexander
 The Son-Daughter (1932) as Fang Fou Hy
 Humanity (1933) as Dr. William MacDonald
 Trick for Trick (1933) as Azrah
 Shanghai Madness (1933) as Li Po Chang
 The Power and the Glory (1933) as Henry
 Doctor Bull (1933) as Dr. Verney, Owner Verney Laboratory
 Walls of Gold (1933) as J. Gordon Ritchie
 The Mad Game (1933) as Judge Penfield
 The Kennel Murder Case (1933) as Raymond Wrede - the Secretary
 Orient Express (1934) as Dr. Richard Czinner
 Stand Up and Cheer! (1934) as Secretary to President
 The Last Gentleman (1934) as Henry Loring
 Their Big Moment (1934) as Dr. Portman
 She Was a Lady (1934) as Stanley Vane
 A Girl of the Limberlost (1934) as Wesley Sinton
 Transatlantic Merry-Go-Round (1934) as Herbert Rosson
 Hell in the Heavens (1934) as Lt. 'Pop' Roget
 Little Men (1934) as Professor Bhaer
 I've Been Around (1935) as John Waring
 The Unwelcome Stranger (1935) as Mike Monahan
 Star of Midnight (1935) as Roger Classon
 Calm Yourself (1935) as Mr. Kenneth S. Rockwell
 Condemned to Live (1935) as Prof. Paul Kristan
 Magnificent Obsession (1935) as Randolph
 Muss 'em Up (1936) as Jim Glenray, Paul's Brother in Law
 Speed (1936) as Mr. Dean
 The Ex-Mrs. Bradford (1936) as Leroy Hutchins, Warcloud's Owner
 Human Cargo (1936) as District Attorney Carey
 Little Miss Nobody (1936) as Gerald Dexter
 Anthony Adverse (1936) as Signore Debruille
 Yellowstone (1936) as James Foster / Anderson
 General Spanky (1936) as Yankee General
 Crack-Up (1936) as John R. Fleming
 The Man in Blue (1937) as The 'Professor'
 Exclusive (1937) as Horace Mitchell
 The Outer Gate (1937) as John Borden
 The Life of Emile Zola (1937) as Commander of Paris
 That's My Story (1937) as Carter
 Mannequin (1937) as Briggs
 Wells Fargo (1937) as Nicholas Pryor
 Love Is a Headache (1938) as Reginald 'Reggie' Odell
 Wives Under Suspicion (1938) as Shaw MacAllen
 Mother Carey's Chickens (1938) as Captain John Carey
 Barefoot Boy (1938) as John Hale
 Army Girl (1938) as Maj. Hal Kennett
 Shadows Over Shanghai (1938) as Howard Barclay
 Out West with the Hardys (1938) as Bill Northcote
 Orphans of the Street (1938) as Martin Sands
 The Lone Wolf Spy Hunt (1939) as Spiro
 Fast and Loose (1939) as Nicholas Torrent
 Man of Conquest (1939) as Stephen F. Austin
 Trapped in the Sky (1939) as Colonel Whalen
 Way Down South (1939) as Timothy Reid Sr.
 Smuggled Cargo (1939) as John Clayton
 Geronimo (1939) as Gen. Steele
 Forty Little Mothers (1940) as Judge Joseph M. Williams
 I'm Still Alive (1940) as Producer Walter Blake
 The Mad Doctor (1941) as Dr. Charles Downer
 Adventure in Washington (1941) as Senator Cummings
 Dick Tracy vs. Crime, Inc. (1941, Serial) as J.P. Morton
 A Close Call for Ellery Queen (1942) as Alan Rogers
 Klondike Fury (1942) as Dr. Brady
 Gang Busters (1942, Serial) as Dr. Clayton Maxton - aka Prof. Mortis
 A Gentleman After Dark (1942) as Morrison
 Night Monster (1942) as Kurt Ingston
 The Traitor Within (1942) as John Scott Ryder
 Hitler's Madman (1943) as Jan Hanka
 Stage Door Canteen (1943) as Ralph Morgan
 Jack London (1943) as George Brett
 The Impostor (aka Strange Confession) (1944) as Col. DeBoivin
 Weird Woman (1944) as Prof. Millard Sawtelle
 The Monster Maker (1944) as Lawrence
 Trocadero (1944) as Sam Wallace
 The Great Alaskan Mystery (1944, Serial) as Dr. Miller
 Enemy of Women (1944) as Mr. Quandt
 The Monster and the Ape (1945, Serial) as Professor Franklin Arnold
 Hollywood and Vine (1945) as B.B. Lavish / Richard Lavish
 This Love of Ours (1945) as Dr. Lane
 Black Market Babies (1945) as Dr. Henry Jordon
 Mr. District Attorney (1947) as Ed Jamison
 Song of the Thin Man (1947) as David I. Thayar
 The Last Round-up (1947) as Charlie Mason
 Sleep, My Love (1948) as Dr. Rhinehart
 Sword of the Avenger (1948) as Don Adolfo Rivera
 The Creeper (1948) as Dr. Lester Cavigny
 Blue Grass of Kentucky (1950) as Maj. Randolph McIvor
 Heart of the Rockies (1951) as Andrew Willard
 Gold Fever (1952) as Nugget Jack (final film)

References

External links

 

 

1883 births
1956 deaths
20th-century American male actors
Academy Honorary Award recipients
American male film actors
American male stage actors
American male radio actors
American male silent film actors
American people of English descent
American people of German descent
American people of Spanish descent
Columbia College (New York) alumni
Columbia Law School alumni
Deaths from lung disease
Presidents of the Screen Actors Guild